Foyt is a surname. Notable people with the surname include:

A. J. Foyt (born 1935), retired American automobile racing driver
Larry Foyt (born 1977), semi-retired NASCAR and IndyCar driver
Victoria Foyt, American author, novelist, screenwriter and actress
A. J. Foyt IV (born 1984), American race car driver

See also
A. J. Foyt Enterprises, American racing team in the IZOD Indycar Series and formerly NASCAR
2007 ABC Supply Company A.J. Foyt 225, race in the 2007 IRL IndyCar Series, held at The Milwaukee Mile
2008 ABC Supply Company A.J. Foyt 225, race in the 2008 IRL IndyCar Series, held at The Milwaukee Mile
2009 ABC Supply Company A.J. Foyt 225, race in the 2009 IndyCar Series, held at the Milwaukee Mile
A. J. Foyt 225 or Milwaukee IndyFest, IndyCar Series race held at the Milwaukee Mile in West Allis, Wisconsin